The 1912–13 season was the 21st in the history of the Western Football League.

The league champions this season were Bristol Rovers Reserves.

Final table
One new club joined the league, and the number of clubs increased from 11 to 12 clubs.
Cardiff City Reserves

References

1912-13
1912–13 in Welsh football
1912–13 in English association football leagues